Yegor Romanovich Danilkin (born 1 August 1995) is a Russian professional football player. He plays as a centre back for FC Volga Ulyanovsk.

Club career
He made his professional debut on 18 May 2015 for FC Dynamo Moscow in a Russian Premier League game against FC Ural Yekaterinburg.

In February 2023, it became known that Danilkin became a Volga player.

Career statistics

References

External links
 

1995 births
People from Vladimir, Russia
Sportspeople from Vladimir Oblast
Living people
Russian footballers
Association football defenders
FC Dynamo Moscow players
FC Khimki players
FC Volga Ulyanovsk players
Russian Premier League players
Russian First League players
Russian Second League players